Biswas Dhakal (Nepali: विश्वास ढकाल, born 14 December 1981 in Bharatpur, Mahottari) is a Nepali tech entrepreneur, innovator and a dynamic investor. He serves as the President of F1Soft International Pvt. Ltd, an ecosystem of digital products and services that facilitates Nepali consumers access to financial services. His journey begins in 2004 when he founded F1Soft. He founded  a digital wallet company in 2009, CashOnAd, Logica Beans, Shiran Technologies Pvt. Ltd. Dhakal was selected by The US Department of State for the International Visitor Leadership Program (IVLP) and the Global Entrepreneurship Summit 2016 from Nepal.

Business 
Dhakal founded F1Soft International Pvt. Ltd. in 2004 while in his freshman year at Nepal College of Information Technology. F1Soft currently serves more than 90% of financial institutions in Nepal with FinTech products, and connects over 3 million people in Nepal to various financial services.

In 2009, Dhakal co-founded , Nepal's first mobile wallet. It carries out over 80% of digital payment in Nepal and process more than 130K transactions a day.

Education 
Dhakal attended Kantipur Engineering College, Tribhuvan University for Computer Engineering and Nepal College of Information Technology, Pokhara University for Software Engineering. He studied FinTech certificate course in Massachusetts Institute of Technology.

Personal life 
Dhakal was born in Bharatpur, Mahottari District of Nepal. He lives with his wife, Isha Sharma and daughter Bibhusa Dhakal in Kathmandu, Nepal.

References 

1981 births
Nepalese businesspeople
Living people
People from Janakpur
Alumni of Pokhara University
21st-century Nepalese businesspeople
Nepalese company founders